Muhammad bin Hadi bin Ghanem bin Zaakan bin Ghanem bin Hassan Al-Suhaimi from Al-Jahadir of Qahtan, was a poet, knight, and sheikh of the Qahtan tribe. The sheikh was born in 1205 AH/1790 AD and died in 1287 AH/1870 AD. His father was Hadi bin Qarmleh, and his mother was Qarmleh bint Shaher, one of the Khanafers of Qahtan. He was one of the most important men of the second Saudi state.

Muhammad bin Hadi and Imam Faisal bin Turki Al Saud 
Ibn Hadi was denounced by Imam Faisal bin Turki. The Imam's anger came from his attacks on some of the tribes loyal to him. When the news reached Ibn Hadi, he resolved to visit the Imam. They arrived at his council and Ibn Hadi asked him not to acknowledge anything until after they listened some verses. He recounted a clarifying poem, and referred to the positions of his tribe in the House of Saud. He said:

Najd region 

Bin Hadi gave him authority over the Najd region and was making disloyal tribes pay money to graze in the Najd region. The situation remained unresolved until the Otaiba tribe waged battles on the Najd region, causing the expulsion of Qahtan and the destruction of the rule of Ibn Hadi.

References 

Qahtanites

Emirs

1790 births

1870 deaths